Nuribta, also Nuribda, was a city, or city-state, located in the vicinity of Magiddo in Israel, in historical Canaan during the time of the Amarna letter correspondence, a 15 to 20 year period from about 1350 to 1335 BC.

The majority of the Amarna letters were written to the pharaoh of Ancient Egypt and the only reference to Naribta is a letter by Biridiya of Magidda, EA 365, entitled: "Furnishing corvée workers", (EA is for 'el Amarna').

A letter of corvée work

EA 365, Biridiya letter no. 7 of 7: "Furnishing corvée workers"
Say [to the ki]ng-(i.e. pharaoh), my lord and my [Su]n: Message of Biridiya, the loyal servant of the king. I fall at the feet of the king, my lord and my Sun, 7 times and 7 times.
May the king, my lord, take cognizance of his servant and his city. In fact, only I am cultivating: ah-ri-šu in Šunama-(Shunem), and only I am furnishing corvée workers. But consider the mayors that are near me. They do not act as I do. They do not cultivate in Šunama, and they do not furnish corvée workers. Only I– ia8-hu-du-un-ni (by myself) furnish corvée workers. From Yapu they come, from [ my] resources here, (and) from Nuribta. And may the king, my lord, take cognizance of his city.  —EA 365, lines 1-31 (complete)

See also
Corvée
Biridiya
Megiddo (place)
Amarna letters–localities and their rulers

References
Moran, William L. The Amarna Letters. Johns Hopkins University Press, 1987, 1992. (softcover)

Amarna letters locations
Canaanite cities
Former populated places in Southwest Asia